Boone Municipal Airport  is a city-owned public-use airport located two nautical miles (4 km) southeast of the central business district of Boone, a city in Boone County, Iowa, United States. It is included in the National Plan of Integrated Airport Systems for 2011–2015, which categorized it as a general aviation facility.

Facilities and aircraft 
Boone Municipal Airport covers an area of 206 acres (83 ha) at an elevation of 1,160 feet (354 m) above mean sea level. It has two runways: 15/33 is 4,808 by 75 feet (1,465 x 23 m) with a concrete surface and 2/20 is 3,248 by 146 feet (990 x 45 m) with a turf surface.

For the 12-month period ending September 28, 2012, the airport had 20,700 aircraft operations, an average of 56 per day: 56% general aviation and 44% military. At that time there were 37 aircraft based at this airport: 76% single-engine, 16% military, 3% multi-engine, 3% glider, and 3% ultralight.

References

External links 
 Boone Municipal (BNW) at Iowa DOT airport directory
 CY Aviation, the fixed-base operator (FBO)
 Aerial image as of April 1994 from USGS The National Map
 

Airports in Iowa
Transportation buildings and structures in Boone County, Iowa